The Royal Marines uniform is the standardised military dress worn by members of the Royal Marines.

Historic
Historically, Marine uniforms broadly matched those of the contemporary British Army, at least for full dress. The constraints of shipboard duty however brought some practical considerations - for ordinary work duties during the late 18th and early 19th centuries the marines would put aside their easily stained red coats and wore the loose "slop" clothing of the British sailors (then known as Jack Tars). The full uniform was worn for watch and guard duties and would also normally be worn in action. It is recorded that at Trafalgar many marines, in the heat of action, discarded their coats and fought in their checked shirts and blue trousers.

The original British marines of the Duke of York and Albany's Maritime Regiment of Foot (1664–1689) wore yellow (probably yellow-brown) coats with red breeches and black felt hats. Other short lived marine regiments during the period 1685 to 1699 wore dark blue, crimson or red coats. Queen Anne's six Marine Regiments wore red coats with different coloured facings according to the preference of their individual colonels. The dress of the ten Regiments of Marines raised for service between 1739 and 1748 is well documented in the coloured illustrations of the official 1742 Clothing Book. All wore red coats and breeches with mitre style caps. Facings, buttons and lace varied according to the regiment.

From the establishment of a permanent corps of Marine Regiments in 1755 to 1802, red coats with white facings were worn.
The normal headdress was a tricorn (later bicorne) hat and the overall appearance closely resembled that of the Army's Regiments of Foot. Grenadier companies were issued with fur hats, for land service only, during the American War of Independence.

In 1802 the granting of the title "Royal Marines" meant a change to dark blue facings and a distinctive round hat made of lacquered felt.
This is the headdress usually associated with the marines of Nelson's navy. White breeches and gaiters were worn for parade during the Napoleonic Wars but blue or white trousers were normal shipboard wear. Short white jackets and bag-like undress caps were part of the sea-kit for ordinary duties, replacing the earlier casual or slop clothing that had often led to confusion between sailors and marines. The newly created Royal Marine Artillery wore the dark blue coat faced in red of the Royal Artillery with only buttons and badges as a distinction.

The relatively peaceful period that followed the Napoleonic Wars saw the uniforms of the Royal Marines again closely follow Army styles. "Bell Top" Shakos and tight tail coats were adopted, regardless of their suitability for seagoing conditions. The Royal Marine Light Infantry continued to wear red coats with dark blue collars and cuffs.

The Royal Marines wore dark blue serge jackets in the Anglo-Egyptian Campaign of 1882 with embroidered badges on their collars - bugle horns for the RMLI and grenades for the RMA. During the subsequent Sudan Campaign a light grey field uniform was adopted. During the siege of the Peking Legations in 1900 the RMLI wore their usual hot weather ship-board working dress of 
blue field service cap, blue tunic and white trousers. Khaki or all white tropical uniforms were worn subsequent to the relief of the Legations.

In 1905 a white cloth helmet with bronze fittings was adopted to be worn with the scarlet and blue full dress of the RMLI and the dark blue and red of the RMA. This headdress was replaced in 1912 by the white Wolseley pattern pith helmet, which remains the most distinctive feature of modern Royal Marine full dress. The Royal Marine Brigade sent to Ostend in August 1914 wore dark blue undress uniforms but khaki service dress or khaki drill was worn for subsequent active service on land during World War I.

During the Inter-War years the newly merged Royal Marines wore a full dress that combined features of both the RMLI and RMA uniforms worn until 1914. This comprised a Wolseley helmet, dark blue tunic and trousers with scarlet collars and trouser welts. Shoulder cords and slashed cuffs were in yellow. This dress is still worn by the Royal Marines Band Service.

During World War II the Royal Marines wore khaki or blue battledress but retained their dark blue undress uniforms with red-banded peaked caps for certain off duty or ceremonial occasions. The well known green beret was introduced for the Royal Marine Commandos in 1942.

Current uniforms
The modern Royal Marines retain a number of distinctive uniform items. These include the green beret, the green "Lovat" service dress, the dark blue parade dress worn with the white Wolsley pattern helmet (commonly referred to as a "pith helmet") or red & white peaked cap, the scarlet and blue mess dress for officers and non-commissioned officers and the white hot-weather dress of the Band Service.

Number 1 Full Dress
This is normally worn only by the Royal Marines Band Service, while the simpler Number 1A dress or "blues" are worn by any other Royal Marine unit undertaking ceremonial duties. The Full Dress dates from 1923 and consists of a royal blue single-breasted tunic with red facings (with gold piping) and yellow cuff slashes. Royal blue trousers with a scarlet stripe and a white pith helmet are also worn. The uniform of the drum major features hussar style braiding across the front of the tunic. This uniform is also worn by the corps of drums of the Royal Marines Volunteer Cadet Corps.

Number 1A Regimental Blues Dress - 'Blues'
This is similar to the 'blue patrol' ceremonial uniform worn by the regiments of the British Army. It features scarlet stripes down the side of the trousers, and is worn with a peaked cap or pith helmet.
It is worn with medals and decorations. Commissioned officers below the rank of major general have a special cut of uniform which is cut very much like British Army service dress, only in royal blue, and is worn with a shirt and tie. General officers wear a uniform very similar to that worn by other ranks, but features gold shoulder cords and gorget patches.

Number 1AW Dress - Tropical Ceremonial Dress
Similar to No 1 'Blues' but worn in tropical climates. The tunic's colour is white instead of blue.

Number 1B Lovat Dress - 'Parade Lovats'

Introduced on the 300th anniversary of the corps in 1964, this is similar in cut to the "Number 2" service dress worn by the British Army (of which it is the equivalent). It is in a unique shade of green known as 'lovat green', and features brown buttons like those worn on service dress by rifle regiments. It is worn with decorations and medals, and is worn with the corps beret, in commando green for those who have passed the commando course, and navy blue with a scarlet patch behind the badge for those who have not passed the commando course who include recruits in training, musicians, cadets and instructors of the affiliated cadet organisations.

Number 1C Dress 'Lovats Undress'
This is the same as 1B dress but is worn with medal ribbons instead of medals and decorations.

Number 2A Formal Evening Dress - 'Mess Dress' and Number 2B 'Mess Undress'
This consists of a scarlet mess jacket with a royal blue shawl collar, worn with royal blue trousers with a scarlet stripe, Marcella shirt and royal blue mess waistcoat. Officers above the rank of brigadier have their rank on shoulder straps, whilst all other officers have their rank marking positioned horizontally on the lapels of the collar. Officers of the rank of lieutenant-colonel and above wear stiff-fronted shirts and overalls (tight fitting cavalry trousers), whilst senior NCOs (for whom mess dress is optional) feature their rank insignia on the right arm. Commissioned officers have the option of wearing a side cap in number 2B dress. Number 2B dress differs only in that the peaked hat is not worn, whereas with 2A dress it is. Miniature medals and decorations are worn with these orders of dress.

Number 2C Informal Evening Dress 'Red Sea Rig'

This is the informal evening uniform worn in ships and establishments. This consists of a white shirt worn with shoulder boards, black shoes, blue trousers and red cummerbund.

Number 3A General Duty Dress 'Half Lovats' (Shirt Sleeve Order) - 'Half Lovats'

This is a semi-formal uniform worn for general day-to-day duties and consists of a stone-coloured short-sleeved shirt, lovat green coloured trousers, worn with the peaked cap (or beret) and a stable belt in the corps colours and black shoes.

Number 3B General Duty Dress Summer - 'Training Rig'

This used to consist of Multi-Terrain Pattern (MTP) combat shirt and trousers worn with brown boots, beret and rank slides, and is worn for day-to-day duties in summer months. On 27 June 2020, the Royal Marines announced they will adopt a new combat uniform from Crye Precision, which includes a change from the MTP camouflage to Crye's proprietary MultiCam pattern; the new uniform also includes insignia changes to reflect the Royal Marines' history (such as returning to red lettering on a navy blue background) and to indicate that they are part of the wider Royal Navy.

Number 3C General Duty Rig - 'Half Lovats' (Winter Order)

This is the same as 3A dress but with an olive-green woolen pullover; with rank slides for officers and rank arm insignia for other ranks, is worn.

Number 3D General Duty Dress - ’Winter Training Rig’

Similar to 3B dress but worn in the field, this presently consists of MTP trousers, smock, undergarments, and optional gaiters, worn with brown boots.

See also
Cap comforter
Royal Marines Band Service#Insignia and uniform
Royal Marines#Uniforms
Uniforms of the British Armed Forces

References

Sources

British military uniforms